The original position (OP), often referred to as the veil of ignorance, is a thought experiment used for reasoning about the principles that should structure a society based on mutual dependence. The phrases original position and veil of ignorance were coined by the American philosopher John Rawls, but the thought experiment itself was developed by William Vickrey and John Harsanyi in earlier writings.

In the original position, you are asked to consider which principles you would select for the basic structure of society, but you must select as if you had no knowledge ahead of time what position you would end up having in that society. This choice is made from behind a "veil of ignorance", which prevents you from knowing your ethnicity, social status, gender and, crucially in Rawls' formulation, your or anyone else's idea of how to lead a good life. Ideally, this would force participants to select principles impartially and rationally.

In Rawls's theory the original position plays the same role that the "state of nature" does in the social contract tradition of Thomas Hobbes, Jean-Jacques Rousseau, and John Locke. The original position figures prominently in Rawls's 1971 book, A Theory of Justice. It has influenced a variety of thinkers from a broad spectrum of philosophical orientations.

History 
The concept of the veil of ignorance has been in use by other names for centuries by philosophers such as John Stuart Mill and Immanuel Kant whose work discussed the concept of the social contract, Adam Smith with his "impartial spectator", or the ideal observer theory. John Harsanyi helped to formalize the concept in economics, and argued that it provides an argument in favor of utilitarianism rather than an argument for a social contract, as rational agents consider expected outcomes, not maximin outcomes or the worst-case outcomes. Harsanyi argued that a person in the original position would maximize their expected utility, rather than choosing minimax. The usage of the term by John Rawls was developed in his 1971 book A Theory of Justice.
Modern work tends to focus on the different decision theories that might describe the choice of the decision-maker "behind the veil". In addition, Michael Moehler has shown that, from a moral point of view, decision theory is not necessarily central to veil of ignorance arguments, but the precise moral ideals that are assumed to model the veil. From a moral point of view, there is not one veil of ignorance but many different versions of it.

Nature of the concept 
Rawls specifies that the parties in the original position are concerned only with citizens' share of what he calls primary social goods, which include basic rights as well as economic and social advantages. Rawls also argues that the representatives in the original position would adopt the maximin rule as their principle for evaluating the choices before them. Borrowed from game theory, maximin stands for maximizing the minimum, i.e., making the choice that produces the highest payoff for the least advantaged position. Thus, maximin in the original position represents a formulation of social equality.

In social contract theory, citizens in a state of nature contract with each other to establish a state of civil society. For example, in the Lockean state of nature, the parties agree to establish a civil society in which the government has limited powers and the duty to protect the persons and property of citizens. In the original position, the representative parties select principles of justice that are to govern the basic structure of society. Rawls argues that the representative parties in the original position would select two principles of justice:

 Each citizen is guaranteed a fully adequate scheme of basic liberties, which is compatible with the same scheme of liberties for all others;
 Social and economic inequalities must satisfy two conditions:
 to the greatest benefit of the least advantaged (the difference principle);
 attached to positions and offices open to all.

The reason that the least well off member gets benefited is that it is argued that under the veil of ignorance people will act as if they were risk-averse. The original position is a unique and irrevocable choice about all the most important social goods, and they do not know the probability they will become any particular member of society. As insurance against the worst possible outcome, they will pick rules that maximize the benefits given to the minimum outcome (maximin).

Recently, Thomas Nagel has elaborated on the concept of original position, arguing that social ethics should be built taking into account the tension between original and actual positions.

Recently, the original position has been modeled mathematically along Wright-Fisher's diffusion, classical in population genetics. The original position has also been used as an argument for negative eugenics, though Rawls' argument was limited to its use as a preventative measure.

Criticisms
In Anarchy, State, and Utopia (1974), Robert Nozick argues that, while the original position may be the just starting point, any inequalities derived from that distribution by means of free exchange are equally just, and that any re-distributive tax is an infringement on people's liberty. He also argues that Rawls's application of the maximin rule to the original position is risk aversion taken to its extreme, and is therefore unsuitable even to those behind the veil of ignorance.

In Liberalism and the Limits of Justice (1982), Michael Sandel has criticized Rawls's notion of a veil of ignorance, pointing out that it is impossible, for an individual, to completely prescind from beliefs and convictions (from the Me ultimately), as is required by Rawls's thought experiment. More recently, the psychological implausibility of Rawls's theory has been highlighted using possible worlds, in a paper that stresses some problematic points of Rawls's proposal.

In a 1987 empirical research study, Frohlich, Oppenheimer and Eavey showed that in a simulated original position, persons throughout a variety of temporal and cultural settings unanimously agreed upon a distributive principle that (in great majority) maximizes the average with a specified floor constraint (a minimum for the worst-off in any given distribution). The finding that a much less demanding distributive principle of justice is agreed upon in a (simulated) original position than Rawls' specification of the "difference principle", implies that the (rational) resistance to a cosmopolitan application of justice as fairness could be less forceful than its critics imagine.

In How to Make Good Decisions and Be Right All the Time (2008), Iain King argues that people in the original position should not be risk-averse, leading them to adopt the Help Principle (Help someone if your help is worth more to them than it is to you) rather than maximin.

See also
 Bayesian probability
 Justice as Fairness: A Restatement
 Divide and choose
 Pie rule
 Tabula rasa

References

Further reading
 Ken Binmore, Natural Justice, Oxford University Press, 2005.
 Samuel Freeman, The Cambridge Companion to Rawls, Cambridge University Press, 2002.
 Thomas Pogge, Realizing Rawls, Cornell University Press, 1989.

External links
 Macquarie University page on this
 'Original Position' article at Stanford Encyclopedia of Philosophy
 Choices of Principles of Distributive Justice in Experimental Groups

Deontological ethics
John Rawls
Justice
Political theories
Social agreement
Social theories
Thought experiments in philosophy

sv:Okunnighetens slöja